Ivughli (also Romanized as Īvūghlī, Īvowghlī, Evoghlī, Evoghlo, Evoghlu, Evoqlī, Evowghlī, and Ū Ūghlī; also known as Mekājīk) is a city in, and the capital of, Ivughli District of Khoy County, West Azerbaijan province, Iran. At the 2006 census, its population was 3,282 in 887 households. The following census in 2011 counted 3,167 people in 918 households. The latest census in 2016 showed a population of 3,320 people in 999 households.

References

External links

 "Ivughli, Iran" Falling Rain Genomics, Inc.
 "Ivughli Map — Satellite Images of Ivughli" Maplandia

Khoy County

Cities in West Azerbaijan Province

Populated places in West Azerbaijan Province

Populated places in Khoy County